National Secondary Route 133, or just Route 133 (or ) is a National Road Route of Costa Rica, located in the Guanacaste province.

Description
In Guanacaste province the route covers Abangares canton (Colorado district).

References

Highways in Costa Rica